Jaroensak Wonggorn (born 18 May 1997) is a Thai professional footballer who plays as a winger for Thai League 1 club Muangthong United and the Thailand national team.

International career
In 2020, He played the 2020 AFC U-23 Championship with Thailand U23 and end the tournament with the Golden boot for 3 goals.

On 12 April 2021, He was named in manager Akira Nishino’s 47-man squad for Thailand’s 2022 World Cup qualification.

In 2022, he was called up for the 2022 AFF Championship by Head Coach Alexandré Pölking.

International goals

Under-23

Honours

Club
BG Pathum United
 Thailand Champions Cup (1): 2022

International
Thailand U-23
 2019 AFF U-22 Youth Championship: Runner up
Thailand
 AFF Championship (1): 2022

Individual
 2020 AFC U-23 Championship: Top scorer
Thai League 1 Player of the Month: December 2020
 Thai League 1 Top Assists: 2020–21
Thai League 1 Best XI: 2020–21
Thai League 1 Rookie of the Year: 2020–21

References

External links
 

1997 births
Living people
Jaroensak Wonggorn
Jaroensak Wonggorn
Jaroensak Wonggorn
Association football midfielders
Jaroensak Wonggorn
Jaroensak Wonggorn
Jaroensak Wonggorn
Jaroensak Wonggorn
Jaroensak Wonggorn
Jaroensak Wonggorn
Jaroensak Wonggorn
Competitors at the 2019 Southeast Asian Games
Jaroensak Wonggorn